Sir John Anstruther, 1st Baronet (c. 1678 – 27 September 1753) was a Scottish politician who sat in the Parliament of Scotland from 1702 to 1707, and in the British House of Commons from 1708 to 1741.

Anstruther was the only son of Sir William Anstruther of Anstruther, M.P. in the Parliament of Scotland and known as Lord Anstruther, Senator of the College of Justices of Scotland (S.C.J.).  Anstruther was created a baronet in the Baronetage of Nova Scotia on 6 January 1700 and succeeded his father in 1711, inheriting Elie House in Elie, Fife.

Anstruther served as Burgh Commissioner in the Parliament of Scotland for Anstruther Easter from 1702 to 1707. His voting record was mixed and his opinions appeared inconsistent. In general he opposed the Union, but took some lead from Lord Rothes and eventually fell in line with the Squadrone. After the Union of England and Scotland, he was not included among the Scottish representatives in the House of Commons in 1707, but was returned unopposed as Member of Parliament for Anstruther Burghs at the 1708 general election. At the 1710 general election there was a contest at Anstruther where he was initially elected but unseated on petition on 10 April 1712. He was elected again in 1713. At the 1715 general election he was returned instead as MP for Fife. He was returned unopposed again in the general elections of 1722, 1727 and 1734. He did not stand in 1741.
 
In 1727 Anstruther was appointed "Sole Master of Works, Inspector and Director-General of all royal buildings in Scotland" by King George II, with responsibility for repairs and alterations to royal palaces and castles north of the border.

Anstruther married, in 1717, Lady Margaret Carmichael, the daughter of James Carmichael, 2nd Earl of Hyndford and had two sons and a daughter. He was succeeded by his eldest son John.

He had a personal library of some significance and books from his collection can be identified by the presence of his engraved bookplate.

References

|-

1678 births
1753 deaths
Baronets in the Baronetage of Nova Scotia
Members of the Parliament of Great Britain for Scottish constituencies
Masters of Work to the Crown of Scotland
Members of the Parliament of Scotland 1702–1707
British MPs 1708–1710
British MPs 1710–1713
British MPs 1713–1715
British MPs 1715–1722
British MPs 1722–1727
British MPs 1727–1734
British MPs 1734–1741
John, 1st Baronet of Anstruther